Valdinei da Silva (born 29 March 1972) is a Brazilian sprinter. He competed in the men's 400 metres at the 1996 Summer Olympics.

References

1972 births
Living people
Athletes (track and field) at the 1996 Summer Olympics
Brazilian male sprinters
Olympic athletes of Brazil
Place of birth missing (living people)
20th-century Brazilian people